Bothriechis nubestris, the Talamancan palm-pitviper, is a species of pit viper native to Costa Rica. The snake was mistaken for Bothriechis nigroviridis.

Description 
The snake is a small-medium size snake. It lives in trees and has a green-black coloration. The snake grows up to 30 inches, but many grow less than 24 inches. It is only discovered in Costa Rica. The snake kills with a toxic called nigroviriditoxin. The toxin itself was discovered in 2015.

Discovery 
The snake was first spotted by the University of Central Florida in 2001, but was mistaken for another species. It was discovered by DNA tests and named recently.

References 

nubestris
Venomous snakes
Reptiles described in 2016
Reptiles of Costa Rica
Reptiles of Central America